Gerry is both a surname and a given name.

Gerry may also refer to:

Places
Gerry, New York, U.S.
Gerry Branch, a river in Tennessee
Gerry, Massachusetts, a city in the United States which later changed its name to Phillipston

Films
Gerry (2002 film), by Gus Van Sant
Gerry (2011 film), a biographical film by Alain Desrochers about Gerry Boulet

Other uses
Gerry (company), an American manufacturer of outdoor sports gear

See also
Jerry (disambiguation)